Werner Klingelfuss (born 11 June 1913; date of death unknown) is a Swiss canoeist who competed in the 1936 Summer Olympics. In 1936 he and his partner Rudolf Vilim finished fifth in the K-2 1000 metres competition.

References
Werner Klingelfuss' profile at Sports Reference.com

1913 births
Year of death missing
Canoeists at the 1936 Summer Olympics
Olympic canoeists of Switzerland
Swiss male canoeists